Renganaden Padayachy is a Mauritian politician.

Early life, education & career
Padayachy grew up in Bel Air and completed his secondary education at John Kennedy College. He studied in France and holds a master's degree in Public Economics (University of Paris I Panthéon-Sorbonne), a master's degree in Industrial Economics (University of Franche-Comté) as well as a Ph.D. in economics from the University of Paris I Panthéon-Sorbonne.

He worked as chief economist at the Mauritius Chamber of Commerce and Industry (MCCI) before he was appointed in January 2018 as first deputy governor of the Bank of Mauritius (BoM) and chairman of the Financial Services Commission (FSC).

Political career
At the 07 November 2019 general elections Renganaden Padayachy stood as candidate of the MSM within the L'Alliance Morisien. He was elected as Second Member for Constituency No.13 Rivière des Anguilles-Souillac in the National Assembly. On 12 November 2019 he was appointed Minister of Finance, Economic Planning and Development.

References

1971 births
Living people
Ministers of Finance of Mauritius
Government ministers of Mauritius
Pantheon-Sorbonne University alumni
Members of the National Assembly (Mauritius)
Militant Socialist Movement politicians
People from Flacq District
Mauritian bankers
Mauritian Hindus
Mauritian politicians of Indian descent